The bluethroat triggerfish (Sufflamen albicaudatum) is a triggerfish from the western Indian Ocean. It is occasionally seen in the aquarium trade.

References

 

Balistidae
Taxa named by Eduard Rüppell
Fish described in 1829